General Quinn may refer to:

Clark Quinn (fl. 1990s–2021s), U.S. Air Force major general
James J. Quinn (Irish Army officer) (1918–1982), Irish Army major general
Matthew T. Quinn (fl. 1990s–2021s), Montana National Guard general
William Wilson Quinn (1907–2000), U.S. Army lieutenant general

See also
Attorney General Quinn (disambiguation)